This is a list of electoral results for the Templestowe Province in Victorian state elections.

Members for Templestowe Province

Election results

Elections in the 2000s

Elections in the 1990s

Elections in the 1980s

Elections in the 1970s

Elections in the 1960s

References

Victoria (Australia) state electoral results by district